Gymnoscelis harterti is a moth in the family Geometridae. It was described by Walter Rothschild in 1915. It is found in Algeria.

References

Moths described in 1915
harterti